Mekhi Kevin Lewis (born April 29, 1999) is an American freestyle and folkstyle wrestler. In freestyle, he was the 2018 junior world champion and the US national runner-up in 2019. As a folkstyle wrestler, Lewis is an NCAA Division I champion and ACC champion out of Virginia Tech and three-time NJSIAA champion as a high schooler.

Folkstyle 
Lewis began wrestling when he was five or six years old.

High school 
He attended Bound Brook High School in New Jersey and went on to win two NJSIAA titles during his high school wrestling years. He was also in the football varsity team.

College 
When he was a high school senior, Lewis committed to Virginia Tech.

2017-2018 
Lewis chose to redshirt and competed unattached and compiled a record of 28 wins and 2 losses, winning multiple open tournaments such as the Hokie, Wolfpack, Storm, Appalachian, and Edinboro Opens. He also placed fourth at the Southern Scuffle.

2018-2019 
As a freshman, Lewis posted a record of 21 wins and 2 losses (13-1 in duals), won the Hokie Open and placed second at the Cliff Keen Invitational during regular season. Post-regular season, he won an ACC title and entered the NCAA championships as the eighth-seeded wrestler at 165 pounds. He opened the tournament with a fall and decision before facing top-seeded Alex Marinelli, whom he also defeated by decision. He then defeated fourth-seeded Evan Wick, making it to the final against second-seeded Vincenzo Joseph. He beat Joseph to become the first Hokie ever to win an NCAA individual championship. After the tournament, he earned the Most Outstanding Wrestler award.

2020-2021 
In 2019-2020 Lewis did not compete as an NCAA athlete. As a 2018 junior world champion and 2019 NCAA champion, he met two of the four criteria to be eligible for an Olympic redshirt, focusing on freestyle and retaining his eligibility as a sophomore.

In 2020-2021, Lewis compiled an 8–1 record during regular season, suffering his only loss via injury, which forced him to forfeit out of the ACC Championships.

Freestyle career

Junior level 
Lewis never competed consistently in freestyle, having attended just two tournaments (US Open and WTT) before his appearance at the 2018 World Championships, being this tournament his first international competition ever. He went on to defeat all of his four opponents (two by technical fall), claiming gold.

Senior level

2019 
After taking an Olympic redshirt for 2019-2020, Lewis was nominated to compete at the Intercontinental Cup as his first senior freestyle competition. He defeated three opponents on his way to the semifinals, where he was downed on points and thrown to the third-place match. He also lost the bronze-medal match, placing fifth.

He then competed at the Bill Farrell Memorial in an attempt to earn a qualification ticket for the Olympic Trials. He defeated two opponents by technical fall and was subsequently matched with Vincenzo Joseph, whom he had defeated earlier that year at the NCAA championship final. He lost on points and was thrown to the consolation brackets. He beat Logan Massa and Thomas Gantt to earn a shot at the bronze medal. In the third-place match, he was defeated by three-time NCAA Division III champion Nazar Kulchytskyy.

In his next attempt to qualify for the Olympic Trials, he competed at the US Nationals. He dominated on his way to the finals with two technical fall victories, an 8-0 victory, and a decision. At the finals, he faced Bill Farrell Memorial opponent Logan Massa and was defeated on points, earning runner-up honors and a run at the Olympic Trials.

2020 
Lewis was scheduled to compete at the 2020 US Olympic Team Trials on April 4 at State College, Pennsylvania. However, the event was postponed for 2021 along with the Summer Olympics due to the COVID-19 pandemic, leaving all the qualifiers unable to compete.

After being unable to compete for almost one year due to the COVID-19 pandemic, Lewis represented the SERTC in the FloWrestling: RTC Cup at 74 kilograms during December 4–5. In the first round against the Ohio RTC, he lost 9-2 to Carson Kharchla, but went on to close the day with a technical fall over Jevon Balfour. In the second day, he was defeated by two-time NCAA Division I All-American Evan Wick, before picking up another technical fall over Balfour and helping the team to make the finals, where he lost to 2020 US national champion Logan Massa in a rematch.

Freestyle record 

! colspan="7"| Senior Freestyle Matches
|-
!  Res.
!  Record
!  Opponent
!  Score
!  Date
!  Event
!  Location
|-
! style=background:white colspan=7 |
|-
|Loss
|13-8
|align=left| Logan Massa
|style="font-size:88%"|2-3
|style="font-size:88%" rowspan=5|December 4–5, 2020
|style="font-size:88%" rowspan=5|FloWrestling RTC Cup
|style="text-align:left;font-size:88%;" rowspan=5| Austin, Texas
|-
|Win
|13-7
|align=left| Jevon Balfour
|style="font-size:88%"|TF 17-6
|-
|Loss
|12-7
|align=left| Evan Wick
|style="font-size:88%"|5-11
|-
|Win
|12-6
|align=left| Jevon Balfour
|style="font-size:88%"|TF 12-2
|-
|Loss
|11-6
|align=left| Carson Kharchla
|style="font-size:88%"|2-9
|-
! style=background:white colspan=7 |
|-
|Loss
|11-5
|align=left| Logan Massa
|style="font-size:88%"|4-6
|style="font-size:88%" rowspan=5|December 22, 2019
|style="font-size:88%" rowspan=5|2019 Senior Nationals - US Olympic Trials Qualifier
|style="text-align:left;font-size:88%;" rowspan=5|
 Ford Worth, Texas
|-
|Win
|11-4
|align=left| Thomas Gantt
|style="font-size:88%"|3-1
|-
|Win
|10-4
|align=left| Chance Marsteller
|style="font-size:88%"|Injury (8-0)
|-
|Win
|9-4
|align=left| Elroy Perkin
|style="font-size:88%"|TF 10-0
|-
|Win
|8-4
|align=left| Jaison White
|style="font-size:88%"|TF 10-0
|-
! style=background:white colspan=7 |
|-
|Loss
|7-4
|align=left| Nazar Kulchytskyy
|style="font-size:88%"|3-9
|style="font-size:88%" rowspan=6|November 16, 2019
|style="font-size:88%" rowspan=6|2019 Bill Farrell Memorial International Open
|style="text-align:left;font-size:88%;" rowspan=6|
 New York, New York
|-
|Win
|7-3
|align=left| Thomas Gantt
|style="font-size:88%"|5-1
|-
|Win
|6-3
|align=left| Logan Massa
|style="font-size:88%"|7-1
|-
|Loss
|5-3
|align=left| Vincenzo Joseph
|style="font-size:88%"|1-4
|-
|Win
|5-2
|align=left| Jakub Sykora
|style="font-size:88%"|TF 11-0
|-
|Win
|4-2
|align=left| James Hunsberger
|style="font-size:88%"|TF 10-0
|-
! style=background:white colspan=7 |
|-
|Loss
|3-2
|align=left| Gadzhimurad Alikhmaev
|style="font-size:88%"|2-6
|style="font-size:88%" rowspan=5|October 14, 2019
|style="font-size:88%" rowspan=5|2019 Intercontinental Wrestling Cup
|style="text-align:left;font-size:88%;" rowspan=5|
 Khasavyurt, Russia
|-
|Loss
|3-1
|align=left| Magoma Dibirgadzhiev
|style="font-size:88%"|3-5
|-
|Win
|3-0
|align=left| Alibek Akbaev
|style="font-size:88%"|7-0
|-
|Win
|2-0
|align=left| Dan Vallimont
|style="font-size:88%"|4-1
|-
|Win
|1-0
|align=left| Davit Gevorgyan
|style="font-size:88%"|3-2

Junior freestyle record 

! colspan="7"| Junior freestyle results
|-
!  Res.
!  Record
!  Opponent
!  Score
!  Date
!  Event
!  Location
|-
! style=background:white colspan=7 | 
|-
|Win
|11-2
|align=left| Abubakar Abakarov
|style="font-size:88%"|5-1
|style="font-size:88%" rowspan=4|September 23, 2018
|style="font-size:88%" rowspan=4|2018 Junior World Wrestling Championships
|style="text-align:left;font-size:88%;" rowspan=4|
 Trnava, Slovakia
|-
|Win
|10-2
|align=left| Bat-Erdene Byambasuren
|style="font-size:88%"|TF 12-1
|-
|Win
|9-2
|align=left| Matthew Bartlett
|style="font-size:88%"|Fall
|-
|Win
|8-2
|align=left| Erik Reinbok
|style="font-size:88%"|TF 10-0
|-
! style=background:white colspan=7 | 
|-
|Win
|7-2
|align=left| Alex Marinelli
|style="font-size:88%"|6-5
|style="font-size:88%" rowspan=3|May 19, 2018
|style="font-size:88%" rowspan=3|2018 US Junior World Team Trials
|style="text-align:left;font-size:88%;" rowspan=3|
 Rochester, Minnesota
|-
|Win
|6-2
|align=left| Travis Wittlake
|style="font-size:88%"|6-1
|-
|Win
|5-2
|align=left| Hayden Hastings
|style="font-size:88%"|8-6
|-
! style=background:white colspan=7 | 
|-
|Win
|4-2
|align=left| Tyler Dow
|style="font-size:88%"|15-8
|style="font-size:88%" rowspan=6|April 27, 2018
|style="font-size:88%" rowspan=6|2018 US Open Junior Wrestling Championships
|style="text-align:left;font-size:88%;" rowspan=6|
 Las Vegas, Nevada
|-
|Loss
|3-2
|align=left| Kaleb Romero
|style="font-size:88%"|6-11
|-
|Loss
|3-1
|align=left| Jeremiah Moody
|style="font-size:88%"|7-9
|-
|Win
|3-0
|align=left| Jarrett Jacques
|style="font-size:88%"|8-4
|-
|Win
|2-0
|align=left| Tanner Skidgel
|style="font-size:88%"|TF 10-0
|-
|Win
|1-0
|align=left| Devin Bahr
|style="font-size:88%"|5-0

NCAA record 

! colspan="8"| NCAA Championship Matches
|-
!  Res.
!  Record
!  Opponent
!  Score
!  Date
!  Event
|-
! style=background:white colspan=6 |2021 NCAA Championships DNP at 165 lbs
|-
|Loss
|7–1
|align=left| Zach Hartman
|style="font-size:88%"|MFOR
|style="font-size:88%" rowspan=3|March 18–20, 2021
|style="font-size:88%" rowspan=3|2021 NCAA Division I Wrestling Championships
|-
|Win
|7–0
|align=left| Tanner Skidgel
|style="font-size:88%"|3–2
|-
|Win
|6–0
|align=left| Brian Meyer
|style="font-size:88%"|8–3
|-
! style=background:white colspan=6 |2019 NCAA Championships  at 165 lbs
|-
|Win
|5–0
|align=left|Vincenzo Joseph
|style="font-size:88%"|7–1
|style="font-size:88%" rowspan=5|March 23, 2019
|style="font-size:88%" rowspan=5|2019 NCAA Division I Wrestling Championships
|-
|Win
|4–0
|align=left|Evan Wick
|style="font-size:88%"|5–2
|-
|Win
|3–0
|align=left|Alex Marinelli
|style="font-size:88%"|3–1
|-
|Win
|2–0
|align=left|Cael McCormick
|style="font-size:88%"|4–1
|-
|Win
|1–0
|align=left|Cam Coy
|style="font-size:88%"|Fall
|-

Stats 

!  Season
!  Year
!  School
!  Rank
!  Weigh Class
!  Record
!  Win
!  Bonus
|-
|2021
|Sophomore
|rowspan=2|Virginia Tech
|#2
|rowspan=2|165
|8–2
|80.00%
|50.00%
|-
|2019
|Freshman
|#8 (1st)
|28–2
|93.33%
|43.33%
|-
|colspan=5 bgcolor="LIGHTGREY"|Career
|bgcolor="LIGHTGREY"|35–2
|bgcolor="LIGHTGREY"|90.00%
|bgcolor="LIGHTGREY"|42.50%

Collegiate awards and records 

Freshman (18-19)
 NCAA Division I (165 lbs)
 ACC Conference (165 lbs)
NCAA Outstanding Wrestler
ACC Wrestler of the Championships
First NCAA champion of the Virginia Tech Hokies' team

Freestyle awards and honors 

2019
 US National Championship (74 kg)
2018
 Junior World Championship (74 kg)
 US Junior World Team Trials (74 kg)

References

External links
 

American male sport wrestlers
1999 births
Living people
Virginia Tech Hokies wrestlers
Sportspeople from New Brunswick, New Jersey